Cyperus aureobrunneus is a species of sedge that is native to Africa, where it occurs in Malawi and Zambia.

The species was first formally described by the botanist Charles Baron Clarke in 1901.

See also
 List of Cyperus species

References

aureobrunneus
Taxa named by Charles Baron Clarke
Plants described in 1901
Flora of Malawi
Flora of Zambia